Tvoje lice zvuči poznato (season 4) may refer to:

 Tvoje lice zvuči poznato (Croatian season 4), the fourth season of the Croatian version of the show Your Face Sounds Familiar
 Tvoje lice zvuči poznato (Serbian season 4), the fourth season of the Serbian version of the show Your Face Sounds Familiar